Cyrille Bayala (born 24 May 1996) is a Burkinabé professional footballer who plays as a winger for  club Ajaccio and the Burkina Faso national team.

Club career
On 31 August 2016, Bayala signed for Moldovan club Sheriff Tiraspol.

A year later, on 31 August 2017, Bayala signed for Lens on a four-year contract. He moved on loan to Sochaux in January until the end of the season.

On 15 January 2021, Bayala signed for French club Ajaccio.

International career
In January 2014, coach Brama Traore, invited him to be a part of the Burkina Faso squad for the 2014 African Nations Championship. The team was eliminated in the group stages after losing to  Uganda and Zimbabwe and then drawing with Morocco.

Cyrille Bayala featured in the 2021 Africa Cup of Nations third place against Cameroon.

Career statistics

Club

International

Scores and results list Burkina Faso's goal tally first, score column indicates score after each Bayala goal.

Honours
Sheriff Tiraspol
 Moldovan National Division: 2016–17
 Moldovan Cup: 2016–17

References

External links
 

Living people
1996 births
Sportspeople from Ouagadougou
Association football wingers
Burkinabé footballers
Burkina Faso international footballers
2014 African Nations Championship players
2017 Africa Cup of Nations players
2021 Africa Cup of Nations players
Egyptian Premier League players
Moldovan Super Liga players
Ligue 2 players
Ligue 1 players
ASFA Yennenga players
FC Sheriff Tiraspol players
RC Lens players
FC Sochaux-Montbéliard players
AC Ajaccio players
Burkinabé expatriate footballers
Burkinabé expatriate sportspeople in Moldova
Expatriate footballers in Moldova
Burkinabé expatriate sportspeople in France
Expatriate footballers in France
21st-century Burkinabé people
Burkina Faso A' international footballers